San Pedro Valley Observatory, originally called Vega-Bray Observatory  is an astronomical observatory  located on a small hill overlooking the San Pedro River Valley, just east of Benson, Arizona (US). Founded in 1990 by Max Bray, an optician and Dr. Eduardo Vega, a pathologist, it is home to the Hoot-Vega Radio Telescope.

See also 
 List of astronomical observatories

References
 

Astronomical observatories in Arizona
San Pedro Valley (Arizona)
Radio telescopes
Buildings and structures in Cochise County, Arizona
1990 establishments in Arizona